Mineralovodsky Urban Okrug is a municipal formation (an urban okrug) in Stavropol Krai, Russia, one of the nine urban okrugs in the krai. Its territory comprises the territories of two administrative divisions of Stavropol Krai—Mineralovodsky District and the town of krai significance of Mineralnye Vody.

It was established by the Law #51-kz of Stavropol Krai of May 28, 2015 by merging the municipal formations of former Mineralovodsky Municipal District into Mineralovodsky Urban Okrug.

References

Notes

Sources

Urban okrugs of Russia
States and territories established in 2015
2015 establishments in Russia
